Vladimir Gapontsev (born 6 September 1985 in Volzhskiy, Soviet Union) is a Russian classical guitarist, specializing in solo and chamber music repertoire from the Baroque, Classical, Romantic, avant-garde, jazz, folk and pop genres.

Biography
Gapontsev was born in Volzhskiy, Russia in 1985, and began to play the guitar at age 11. In 1997 he won a local guitar competition. In 2000 he entered the Volgograd Municipal College of Arts and in 2004 he continued his studies at guitar at Serebryakov Institute of Arts in Volgograd, studying under with Sergey Matokhin. During his studies he won prizes at many international guitar competitions in Russia and abroad and won scholarships from the Administration of Volgograd Region (2002), Ministry of Culture of Russian Federation (2003), Federal Agency of Culture and Cinematography ("Young talents of Russia", 2006).
     
Since 2005 he has been a regular participant of international master classes in Russia and Europe.

Gapontsev began teaching in 2006 as a classical and electric guitar teacher at the Serebryakov Institute. In 2010—2012 he was a guitar teacher at Igumnov music school, Moscow. In 2014, he is regularly invited as a performer, teacher and member of the jury to international festivals in Russia, Ukraine, Romania, Israel and other countries.

As a solo player and a chamber musician, Gapontsev has performed at venues such as Glinka state museum of musical art, Moscow Conservatoire Grand Hall, Central House of Journalist in Moscow, Vladimir Philharmonic Hall, S. Prokofiev museum, State Tretyakov gallery, Volgograd Central Concert Hall, Elena Obraztsova Cultural Center in Saint-Petersburg, Royal College of Music, London and others.

Besides solo recitals and teaching, he is also devoted to chamber music, arrangement and composing. Since 2012, Gapontsev has been a member of the Russian Guitar Quartet, a group of musicians concentrated on professional playing the original music of modern Russian composers. He also performs guitar concertos with symphonic orchestras in Russia and abroad, and collaborates with musicians of different styles including classics, jazz, bossa nova, and folk.

Prizes

References

External links
 Vladimir Gapontsev at MusicaNeo
 Russian Guitar Quartet
 Иллюстрированный биографический энциклопедический словарь Vladimir Gapontsev/ abc-guitars.com

Living people
1985 births
People from Volzhsky, Volgograd Oblast
Russian classical guitarists
Russian male guitarists
21st-century guitarists
21st-century Russian male musicians